Christian Menzel (born 22 June 1971 in Langenfeld (Rheinland)) is a German racecar driver.

His career started in 1981 in Karts. Since 1991 he competed in ADAC BMW Formula Junior, later Formula Renault and since 1994 Formula 3.

In 1998 he won together with Hans-Joachim Stuck and Marc Duez the 24 Hours Nürburgring on a BMW 320 Diesel.

Since 2000 Menzel was active in the Deutsche Tourenwagen Masters (DTM) for Opel.

The main activity of Christian Menzel is racing in the Porsche Carrera Cup (winner 2005) and Porsche Supercup, since 2008 in the Porsche Carrera Cup Asia, in which he finished second.

Racing record

Complete Deutsche Tourenwagen Masters results
(key) (Races in bold indicate pole position) (Races in italics indicate fastest lap)

Complete Porsche Supercup results
(key) (Races in bold indicate pole position) (Races in italics indicate fastest lap)

‡ Not eligible for points

External links 
Homepage

German racing drivers
Deutsche Tourenwagen Masters drivers
1971 births
Living people
People from Mettmann (district)
Sportspeople from Düsseldorf (region)
Racing drivers from North Rhine-Westphalia
Porsche Supercup drivers
Blancpain Endurance Series drivers
24 Hours of Spa drivers

BMW M drivers
Abt Sportsline drivers
German Formula Three Championship drivers
KCMG drivers
Schnitzer Motorsport drivers
Nürburgring 24 Hours drivers
Porsche Carrera Cup Germany drivers